The Benza is a Japanese web television comedy that premiered on Amazon Prime Video via Prime Video Direct in April 2019 in the United States, United Kingdom, and Japan.  It then premiered in Germany in July 2019.  It is currently available in over 130 countries via Amazon Prime Video and Plex.

The series follows Kyle (Kyle Card) and Chris (Christopher McCombs) as they try to figure out how their  broke and prevent the end of the world.  The six episode first season was filmed entirely on location in Tokyo, Japan by director Raito Nishizaka.  The seven episode second season was released in Japan via Amazon Prime Video in December 2021 and was directed by Raito Nishizaka and Michael Williams.  The entire series was written by series creator Christopher McCombs.

History
"The Benza" began as a Japanese short film that was partially inspired by true events. Pre-production began in early 2018 and the short film premiered in Tokyo, Japan on April 6 of the same year.  After receiving several awards from various film festivals around the world including Best Comedy at Mediterranean Film Festival in Italy, Rising Star for main cast Christopher McCombs and Best Pilot at Seoul Web Fest in 2018, Tokyo Cowboys received an offer from Korean mobile service KT mobile to create a series based on the short film.

The first series began shooting in September 2018 and wrapped filming in mid-December. Post production continued into mid-January 2019.

The second series of The Benza held its world premiere at MCM Comic Con Birmingham in November 2021 and held its domestic premiere in Tokyo, Japan at Nakano Zero on December 11, 2021.

Series creator Christopher McCombs said on UK news site Otaku News, ""The Benza" has been in the works for over a year and I am so happy we can finally sit back and enjoy it with everyone. It's so important to take a step back and laugh so that we can get back to the important things in life. "The Benza" is the perfect way to take a break, smile, and refresh." Lead actress Haku Inko added, "We set out to make an outrageous comedy and I think we did, but it's not finished until we hear your laughter. It's such a lovely idea that people all over the world might be laughing together about "The Benza.""

Plot
Chris and Kyle are two Americans who share an apartment in Tokyo. They lived in peace and happiness until the day their toilet seat broke. This leaves them with questions such as  what happened to their toilet seat? How does one say 'toilet seat' in Japanese? Where does one buy a toilet seat in Japan? These questions are explored by Chris and Kyle on their journey for answers.

Cast

Main

 Kyle Card as Kyle
 Christopher McCombs as Chris
 Haku Inko as Inko-sensei
 Michiko Noguchi as Noguchi and Za
 Masahito Kawahata as Tamura
 Janni Olsson as Alena
 Lee Min Kuk as Lee
 Alexander Hunter as David (Season 2)
 Hannah Grace as Stephanie (Season 2)
 Kaori Ikeda as Kaori (Season 2)

Recurring
 Kosuke Imai as Kosuke
 Maria Papadopoulou as Maria (Season 2)
 Shizuka Anderson as Carol (Season 2)
 Maxwell Powers as Max (Season 2)

Episodes

Series overview

Season 1 (2019)

Season 2 (2021)

Reception

The Benza has been over all well received and maintains an over 4 point score on Amazon Prime Video in America, Germany, Japan, and U.K.

Sora News24 writer Master Blaster wrote, "Full of literal toilet humor and heart, this Amazon Prime series is a breath of fresh air." Master Blaster continues, "But what really stands out about The Benza is that it depicts foreigners in Japan as normal people rather than the stereotypes we are used to seeing on Japanese TV." Speaking about the international cast he says, "With a nice balance of Japanese and foreign performers, the result is a series that is able to poke fun at each other without ever being demeaning."

Spin-Off

In 2019, it was announced that "The Benza" receive a spin-off series called "Benza English".  Production began in late 2019, and the series was released in April 2020.  The series features minor characters from "The Benza" appearing in larger roles along with the original series' main cast, and is set in an English learning television show that takes place in the world of "The Benza".

In 2020, a spin-off retro rpg video game called "The Benza RPG" was announced. It was initially released for iOS platforms in October 2020 and takes place between "Benza English" and series two of "The Benza". The player primarily plays as Chris and Kyle as they try to save Higashi Nakano from Inko Sensei and save Lee who has been kidnapped.  The Benza RPG is currently available for iOS and Android devices as well as for PC and Mac via Steam in Japanese and English.  Plans for a Nintendo Switch port were announced by Christopher McCombs via Steam in December 2021.

Awards and honors
The following are nominations and awards that have been earned by the cast and crew of The Benza for series 1 in 2019:

The following are awards that have been earned by the cast and crew of The Benza during its short film iteration in 2018:

References

External links
 The Benza at Tokyo Cowboys Official Website
 

2019 web series debuts